Woodstock '79 was a rock concert that took place at the Felt Forum at Madison Square Garden, New York City on August 24 and 25, 1979, the year of the 10th anniversary of the original Woodstock Festival.

The word "Woodstock" did not appear in the advertisement for the event, it was simply billed as "Celebration: Ten Years Later."

Some of the musicians performed at the original festival of 1969. There were jam sessions with Richie Havens, Taj Mahal, Alhaji Bai Konte, Dembo Konte, Country Joe and the Fish, Canned Heat, Jeff "Skunk" Baxter and Elliott Randall. Also appearing were Rick Danko, Jorma Kaukonen, Stephen Stills, Paul Butterfield, and Johnny Winter among others.

In 1991, an 80-minute video with the title The Celebration Continues:Woodstock '79 was released.

Songs 
"Woodstock Boogie"
"New York Boogie"
"Here Comes the Sun"
"On the Road Again"
"Stand"
"Solid Gone"
"Paint My Mailbox Blue"
"George Buck" - Taj Mahal, Alhaji Bai Konte, Dembo Konte
"Save the Whales"
"Stage Fright" - Rick Danko and Paul Butterfield
"Crazy Mama"
"Sail on Sailor"
"Lose Control"
"Freight Train"
"Nobody Left to Crown"
"Chicken Shack"
"Roots"
"Freedom"

References

1979 music festivals
1979 in New York City
Concerts in the United States
Events in New York City
Madison Square Garden
Reunions
Woodstock Festival
1970s in Manhattan